Lance Laury (born January 17, 1982) is a former American football linebacker. He was signed by the Seattle Seahawks as an undrafted free agent in 2006. He played college football at South Carolina.

Laury has also played for the New York Jets.

Early years 
Laury attended Lower Richland High School and was a student and a letterman in football and baseball. In football, he was a two-time All-Conference selection. Laury still owns the Lower Richland record for the most single season tackles with 201 in 11 games.

Laury was drafted by the Chicago Cubs during the 2000 MLB Draft in the 48th round as a center fielder.

Professional career

Seattle Seahawks 
On November 12, 2006, Laury was signed to the active roster from the practice squad after Marcus Tubbs was placed on injured reserve. He played for them until 2009.

New York Jets 
Laury signed with the New York Jets on March 19, 2010.

References

External links 
South Carolina Gamecocks bio

1982 births
Living people
People from Hopkins, South Carolina
American football linebackers
South Carolina Gamecocks football players
Seattle Seahawks players
New York Jets players